Rural Hill (also Ruralhill) is an unincorporated community in Hamilton County, Illinois, United States.

Notes

Unincorporated communities in Hamilton County, Illinois
Unincorporated communities in Illinois